Michaela Schabinger (born 23 March 1961) is a German sprinter. She competed in the women's 200 metres at the 1984 Summer Olympics representing West Germany.

References

External links
 

1961 births
Living people
Athletes (track and field) at the 1984 Summer Olympics
Athletes (track and field) at the 1988 Summer Olympics
German female sprinters
Olympic athletes of West Germany
Place of birth missing (living people)
Olympic female sprinters